Elaeocarpus obovatus, commonly known as hard quandong, blueberry ash, whitewood, grey carabeen, freckled oliveberry or gray carrobeen, is a species of flowering plant in the family Elaeocarpaceae and is endemic to eastern Australia. It is a tree with buttress roots at the base of the trunk, egg-shaped to lance-shaped leaves with the narrower end towards the base, racemes of white flowers, and blue, oval fruit.

Description 
The outer bark is smooth, grey and thin with corky irregularities. The edges of the leaves are wavy, scalloped or toothed and the midrib is raised on the upper and lower surfaces. The petals are white, egg-shaped to oblong and about the same size as the sepals with the tip divided into eight to ten lobes and there are about twenty very short stamens. Fruiting occurs in January to April.

Taxonomy
Elaeocarpus obovatus was first formally described in 1831 by George Don in his book A General History of Dichlamydeous Plants.

Distribution and habitat
Hard quandong is a tall tree in subtropical rainforest and a small to medium-sized tree in drier rainforest and occurs from Proserpine, Queensland (20° S) in to central-eastern Queensland south as far as Wyong (33° S) in New South Wales.

References

obovatus
Oxalidales of Australia
Trees of Australia
Flora of Queensland
Flora of New South Wales